Koukoutamba Hydroelectric Power Station is a planned  hydroelectric power station, across the Bafing River, a tributary of the Senegal River, in Guinea. The power station is under development by the Organisation pour la mise en valeur du fleuve Sénégal (OMVS), (English: Senegal River Basin Development Authority). OMVS will sell the electricity to the four member electricity utility companies of the organization. Sinohydro, a hydropower engineering and construction company, owned by the  Chinese state, was awarded the engineering, procurement and construction (EPC) contract. The US$812 million project is funded by the Exim Bank of China.

Location
The power station would be located in the community of Koukoutamba, in Tougué Prefecture, in the Labé Region of Guinea.

Overview
The proposed Koukoutamba Dam will serve multiple purposes. The water stored here will help create benefits in the areas of drinking water, agriculture, livestock farming, fishing and water transport.

The power generated here will be shared equally among the four electricity utility companies of the member states of the OMVS, the entity that is developing and owns the dam and power station.

Ownership
The table below illustrates the member electricity utility companies of the Organisation pour la mise en valeur du fleuve Sénégal (OMVS), the Senegal River Basin Development Authority, which owns and is developing the Koukoutamba Hydroelectric Power Station.

Construction costs and funding
The engineering, procurement and construction (EPC) contract for this project was awarded to Sinohydro, the Chinese, state-owned hydropower engineering and construction company. The construction budget has been reported as US$812 million.

The construction funds will be borrowed from the Exim Bank of China. Once started, construction is expected to take four years.

See also

List of power stations in Guinea
Kaleta Hydropower Plant

References

External links
 Chinese Dam Project In Guinea Could Kill Up To 1,500 Chimpanzees As of 28 February 2019.

Hydroelectric power stations in Guinea
Proposed hydroelectric power stations
Labé Region